Amiens station (locally known as: Gare du Nord) is the main railway station for the Northern French city of Amiens.

History
The station opened on 15 March 1847 when the line to Abbeville started passenger operations. It was razed by German shelling in World War I, rebuilt, then destroyed again by the Allied forces during World War II and replaced by the present structure built in 1955 by Auguste Perret. A tower called the Tour Perret was built at the same time close to the station. The station district's buildings were collectively registered as a historic monument in 2004.

Amiens is both a terminus and a through station. A concourse was built over the six platforms to facilitate passenger movement. Although the station front was built between adjoining buildings, the hall is as big as its Parisian counterparts.

Services

The station is served by the local TER Normandie and TER Hauts-de-France services to destinations that include Rouen, Calais, Lille, Reims, Compiègne and Paris-Nord. The station is not served by the TGV (high-speed train), but there is currently a bus service between Amiens and the Haute-Picardie TGV station.

Pictures

See also
Amiens Saint-Roch station

References

External links

 

Buildings and structures in Amiens
Railway stations in Somme (department)
Railway stations in France opened in 1847